The Truman Capote Literary Trust is an American charitable trust established in 1994 by Truman Capote's literary executor, Alan U. Schwartz, pursuant to Capote's will.

Origin
Capote died in 1984 and his will established a lifetime annuity for his companion, Jack Dunphy. It further stipulated that, on Dunphy's death, a literary trust be created that would be sustained by the royalties from Capote's books. Dunphy died in 1992, and the trust was finally established in 1994.

The trust is located in Los Angeles.

Awards

For critics
In cooperation with the Iowa Writers Workshop at the University of Iowa, the Trust awards the annual Truman Capote Award for Literary Criticism in Memory of Newton Arvin, commemorating not only Capote but also his friend Newton Arvin, the Smith College professor and critic, who lost his job after his homosexuality was exposed. The prize is worth $30,000.

The Trust also established a lifetime achievement award, worth $100,000, and administered through the Stanford University Creative Writing Program.  It has been awarded to Alfred Kazin (1996) and George Steiner (1998).

For students
The Trust awards graduate level fellowships at universities such as Cornell University, the University of Iowa, the University of Alabama, and the University of North Carolina. It also funds undergraduate level scholarship programs to promote creative writing programs through various universities and colleges.

References

1994 establishments in the United States
Charities based in California
Arts organizations established in 1994